Velyka Bilozerka Raion was one of raions (districts) of Zaporizhzhia Oblast in southern Ukraine. The administrative center of the region was the selo of Velyka Bilozerka. In the 21st century, this is the only raion in Ukraine which had a rural locality as an administrative center. The raion was abolished on 18 July 2020 as part of the administrative reform of Ukraine, which reduced the number of raions of Zaporizhzhia Oblast to five. The area of Velyka Bilozerka Raion was merged into Vasylivka Raion.

References

Former raions of Zaporizhzhia Oblast
1993 establishments in Ukraine
Ukrainian raions abolished during the 2020 administrative reform